Gokhale is an Indian surname found in the Chitpawan community native to the western state of Maharashtra.

People
Anupama Gokhale, Indian chess player
Ashok B. Gokhale, Indian diplomat
 Bapu Gokhale, Maratha general
Chandrakant Gokhale, Yesteryear marathi actor and father of Vikram Gokhale
 Gopal Krishna Gokhale, leader in the Indian independence movement
H. R. Gokhale, Indian politician, former minister of law and justice, father-in-law of writer Namita Gokhale
Hemant Gokhale, former judge of the Supreme Court of India, and former Chief Justice of the Allahabad High Court
Kamlabai Gokhale, one of India's first female actresses, mother of actor Chandrakant Gokhale
 Mohan Gokhale, actor
Namita Gokhale, writer, daughter-in-law of politician H. R. Gokhale
Padmavati Gokhale Shaligram, Hindustani vocalist and music educator
Poorva Gokhale, leading marathi television actress
 Rajesh Sudhir Gokhale, chemical biologist
 Ramesh Gokhale, Indian bridge player
Sakhi Gokhale , marathi television actress and daughter of Mohan Gokhale and Shubhangi Gokhale
Sayali Gokhale, Indian badminton player
 Shanta Gokhale, writer, translator, journalist, theater critic and mother of actress Renuka Shahane
Shubhangi Gokhale, actress and wife of actor Mohan Gokhale
Vidyadhar Gokhale, Marathi playwright, editor, and politician
 Vijay Keshav Gokhale, diplomat, 32nd Foreign Secretary of India
 Vikram Gokhale, actor
 Vishnubawa Brahmachari (Vishnu Bhikaji Gokhale), Sannyasi, Vedic revivalist, Social reformer

Other uses
 Gokhale Institute of Politics and Economics

References

Indian surnames
Indian words and phrases